Pilosocereus catingicola is a  flowering plant in the family Cactaceae that is endemic in northeastern Brazilian states of Rio Grande do Norte, Pernambuco, Alagoas, Sergipe, Paraíba, Bahia.

The plant is bat-pollinated, by Goldman's nectar bat.

References

External links
 
 

catingicola
Endemic flora of Brazil